Alen J. Matković (born 20 July 1970), known professionally as Alan Michael, is a Yugoslav-born Polish-Dutch singer, songwriter and record producer. He is known for his participation in the 1987 Sopot International Song Festival and for being one of the songwriters of the Dutch Eurovision Song Contest entries "One Good Reason" and "One More Night".

Biography 
Matković was born on 20 July 1970 in Rijeka, SR Croatia, SFR Yugoslavia to a Polish mother and a Yugoslav father. He moved to the Netherlands in his early childhood and grew up in Zandvoort, North Holland. Matković began playing piano at the age of six, and recorded his first single when he was twelve years old. His second single, "Is That You", was released by the record label Warner-Elektra-Atlantic (WEA) in 1987.

In the same year, he represented the Netherlands in the Sopot International Song Festival with the song "Romeo and Juliet", alongside Maywood with the song "Stay with Me". For his performance, he was awarded the "FIDOF Award". Due to his participation in the Sopot Festival, Matković gained popularity in Poland, and "Romeo and Juliet" was released on single by the Polish record label . One year later, he released his self-titled debut album with the Polish record label Pronit. The songs "Sandy" and "Dreams of Love" from this album also appeared on his second album The Winning Edge, and were released on single by CBS Records International in 1989.

Following the release of The Winning Edge, Matković was signed to the Hilversum-based record label . In 1992, a third studio album, titled One for a While, was released. Despite successes in Eastern Europe, such as a gold record in Poland, Matković never broke through as a singer in the Netherlands. In April 1993, he featured in the television documentary  ("Hooray, a hit") by the Dutch broadcaster VARA, which documented his efforts to produce a hit in his home country.

A few days before the documentary was broadcast, Matković had competed in the Nationaal Songfestival – the Dutch national selection for the Eurovision Song Contest – as one of the songwriters of the entry "", which finished in fourth place. He subsequently began pursuing a career as a songwriter and founded his own recording studio, AM Studios, in Zandvoort. Between 1997 and 2005, he competed in the Nationaal Songfestival six times, winning it twice as a songwriter of the entries "One Good Reason" (1999) and "One More Night" (2003). The songs finished in 8th and 13th place in the Eurovision Song Contest, and "One More Night" received a Marcel Bezençon Award for the best entry according to previous winners of the contest.

Discography

Studio albums

Singles

Songwriting discography

Charting singles

Eurovision Song Contest entries

entries

References 

Living people
1970 births
20th-century Dutch composers
20th-century Dutch male musicians
20th-century Dutch male singers
21st-century Dutch composers
21st-century Dutch male musicians
Dutch composers
Dutch people of Croatian descent
Dutch people of Polish descent
Dutch record producers
Dutch songwriters
CBS Records artists
Musicians from North Holland
Musicians from Rijeka
People from Zandvoort
Polish expatriates in the Netherlands
Yugoslav expatriates in the Netherlands
Warner Music Group artists